Le'Shai Edwoin Maston (born October 7, 1970) is a former American football running back in the National Football League (NFL) and current head football coach at Providence Christian School of Dallas, Texas. He played college football at Baylor University. From 1993 to 1998, Maston played for the NFL teams Houston Oilers, Jacksonville Jaguars, and Washington Redskins.

Maston graduated from David W. Carter High School of Dallas in 1989 and was a member of the Carter 1988 Texas state championship football team, that later had to forfeit the championship due to eligibility reasons. He then attended Baylor University and played on the Baylor Bears football team from 1989 to 1992. In 1995, Maston graduated with a degree in business management. Maston is a member of the Omega Psi Phi fraternity.

Maston became an officer for the Dallas Police Department in 1999. In 2009, Maston became head football coach at Providence Christian School of Dallas.

References

1970 births
Living people
American football running backs
Baylor Bears football players
Houston Oilers players
Jacksonville Jaguars players
Washington Redskins players
Players of American football from Dallas